Sarbach is a surname. Notable people with the surname include: 

Peter Sarbach (1844–1930), Swiss mountain guide
Ulrich Sarbach (born 1954), Swiss sports shooter

See also
Mount Sarbach, a mountain in Banff National Park, Canada